Luksimi Sivaneswaralingam (born 26 September 1993) is a Canadian playback singer and classical dancer from Toronto, Ontario, Canada. Luksimi Sivaneswaralingam was three years old when she began her lessons in music.

Career
She began as a carnatic music student and soon included lessons in Western classical and popular vocals, bharathanatyam, veena and piano. She performed in competitions, in both Carnatic and film genres.

Luksimi Sivaneswaralingam is a University of Toronto alumni, as she graduated from the University of Toronto Faculty of Music with a Bachelor of Music – Voice Performance Specialist (western classical), in addition to a Bachelor of Music – Carnatic Vocal from Annamalai University's Canada Campus. Continuing with her education, in 2017 she completed her post graduate degree at Wilfrid Laurier University for curriculum based music programs. She is now an OCT certified teacher.

Songs

 Album Ippadai Vellum

Awards and nominations
She has been conferred with the title of Natya Kala Jyothi for her classical dance.

References

1993 births
Living people
Musicians from Toronto
Canadian playback singers
Canadian female dancers
Canadian people of Sri Lankan Tamil descent
Tamil playback singers
Canadian expatriates in India
Expatriate musicians in India
University of Toronto alumni
Annamalai University alumni
Wilfrid Laurier University alumni
21st-century Canadian singers
21st-century Canadian women singers
21st-century Canadian dancers